Kurt Frank was a Wisconsin lawyer who served three terms as a Democratic member of the Wisconsin State Senate.

Biography
Frank was born on March 20, 1945, in Milwaukee, Wisconsin. He is a graduate of the University of Wisconsin–Milwaukee and Marquette University. Frank became a lawyer and served in the Army National Guard.

Political career
In 1970 Frank unseated 73-year-old conservative Democratic incumbent Senator Leland McParland, who had been in the legislature since winning office in 1940, in a four-way Democratic primary. Frank served as a member of the Senate from 1971 to 1983; he did not run for re-election in 1982, after his district was redistricted, and was succeeded by fellow Democrat Gerald D. Kleczka.

References

External links
The Political Graveyard

Politicians from Milwaukee
Democratic Party Wisconsin state senators
Wisconsin lawyers
Military personnel from Milwaukee
United States Army soldiers
University of Wisconsin–Milwaukee alumni
Marquette University alumni
1945 births
Living people
Lawyers from Milwaukee